Fitkin is a surname. Notable people with the surname include:

Abram Fitkin (1878–1933), American minister and businessman
Graham Fitkin (born 1963), British composer
Mary Louise Fitkin (1907–1987), American activist
Susan Norris Fitkin (1870–1951), Canadian ordained minister